Dai Yongge (born 28 April 1968) is a Chinese businessman and entrepreneur. He is currently the Executive Chairman of Renhe Commercial Holdings Company Limited, a listed investment holding company who specialise in the operation of shopping centres transformed from air-raid shelters. They have centres in 30 cities across China, including Harbin, Guangzhou, Wuhan and Shenyang.

Dai owns Reading FC and used to own
Beijing Renhe before it was dissolved in 2021.

Football

In 2012, Dai's company completed the takeover of Shaanxi Baorong Chanba. One year later, they relocated the club to Guizhou and re-branded them Guizhou Renhe. After two years in Guizhou, the club moved to Beijing and became Beijing Renhe, who currently compete in China League One.

In August 2016, Dai and his sister, Dai Xiu Li, were the subject of a potential £130m takeover of Premier League club Hull City.

In May 2017, Renhe bought 75% of the shares in English club Reading, after the Football League announced that they had no objections to the group's takeover.

In June 2017, it was announced that Dai had contacted Johan Plancke, Chairman of Belgian club KSV Roeselare, to recruit two coaches to train Chinese youth coaches during an internship planned for August of the same year.

References 

Living people
1968 births
Chinese football chairmen and investors
Sportspeople from Harbin
Businesspeople from Harbin
Chairmen of Reading F.C.